Thomas Gisborne (1789 – 20 July 1852) was an English Whig politician who sat in the House of Commons variously between 1830 and 1852.

Life
Gisborne was the son of Thomas Gisborne, Prebendary of Durham. He was educated at Trinity College, Cambridge being awarded B.A. in 1810.

At the 1830 UK general election Gisborne was elected Member of Parliament for Stafford and held the seat until 1832. In the reformed parliament after the 1832 UK general election he was elected MP for North Derbyshire and held the seat until 1837. On 27 Feb. 1839 he was elected MP for Carlow Borough until 1841.  He failed to win a seat in Ipswich in a by-election in 1842. He was elected MP for Nottingham in 1843 and held the seat until his defeat in 1847.
 
Gisborne lived at Horwick House, Derbyshire and at Yoxall Lodge, Staffordshire where he died at the age of 62.

Gisborne married firstly Elizabeth Fysche Palmer, daughter of John Palmer, of Ickwell, Bedfordshire and secondly in 1826, Susan Astley, widow of Francis Duckenfield Astley. He was survived by his eldest son Thomas Guy Gisborne (1812–69). His second son Henry Fyshe Gisborne (1813–41), a colonial commissioner, predeceased him.

References

External links 

1789 births
1852 deaths
Whig (British political party) MPs for English constituencies
Whig (British political party) MPs for Irish constituencies
Members of the Parliament of the United Kingdom for Stafford
UK MPs 1830–1831
UK MPs 1831–1832
UK MPs 1832–1835
UK MPs 1835–1837
UK MPs 1837–1841
UK MPs 1841–1847
Members of the Parliament of the United Kingdom for County Carlow constituencies (1801–1922)
Members of the Parliament of the United Kingdom for constituencies in Derbyshire
Alumni of Trinity College, Cambridge